Events from the year 1881 in the United States. For the second time in history (after 1841), the country had three different presidents in one calendar year: Rutherford B. Hayes, James A. Garfield, and Chester A. Arthur.

Incumbents

Federal Government 
 President:
 until March 4: Rutherford B. Hayes (R-Ohio)
 March 4–September 19: James A. Garfield (R-Ohio)
 starting September 19: Chester A. Arthur (R-New York)
 Vice President:
 until March 4: William A. Wheeler (R-New York)
 March 4–September 19: Chester A. Arthur (R-New York)
 starting September 19: vacant
 Chief Justice: Morrison Waite (originally from Connecticut; lived in U.S. state of Ohio)
 Speaker of the House of Representatives: Samuel J. Randall (D-Pennsylvania) (until March 4), J. Warren Keifer (R-Ohio) (starting December 5)
 Congress: 46th (until March 4), 47th (starting March 4)

Events

January–March

 January 25 – Thomas Edison and Alexander Graham Bell form the Oriental Telephone Company.
 February 2 – The 5.6  Parkfield earthquake affects central California with a maximum Mercalli intensity of VII (Very strong). Some damage occurred near Imusdale northwest of Parkfield, including cracks in the roads, fallen chimneys, and partially collapsed buildings.
 February 5 – Phoenix, Arizona, is incorporated.
 February 14 – Pine City, Minnesota is incorporated.
 February 19 – Kansas becomes the first U.S. state to prohibit all alcoholic beverages.
 February 22 – Cleopatra's Needle is erected in Central Park, New York City.
 March –  Barnum & Bailey's "Greatest Show on Earth" opens in Madison Square Garden.
 March 4 – James A. Garfield is sworn in as the 20th President of the United States, and Chester A. Arthur is sworn in as Vice President of the United States.
 March 15 – First plots of Abilene, Texas, are auctioned; the town is incorporated later in the year.

April–June
 April 11 – Spelman College is established.
 April 14 – The Four Dead in Five Seconds Gunfight erupts in El Paso, Texas.
 April 16 – Bat Masterson fights his last gun battle in Dodge City, Kansas.
 April 21 – The University of Connecticut is founded as the Storrs Agricultural School.
 April 28 – Billy the Kid escapes from his two jailers at the Lincoln County Jail in Mesilla, New Mexico, killing James Bell and Robert Ollinger before stealing a horse and riding out of town.
 May 21 
The American Red Cross is established by Clara Barton.
The United States Tennis Association (USNLTA) is established by a small group of tennis club members; the first U.S. Tennis Championships are played this year.
 June 12 – The USS Jeannette is crushed in an Arctic Ocean ice pack.

July–September

 July 2 – Assassination of James A. Garfield: James A. Garfield, President of the United States, is shot by lawyer Charles J. Guiteau at the Baltimore and Potomac Railroad Station in Washington, D.C. He survives the shooting but suffers from infection of his wound, dying on September 19.
 July 4 – The Tuskegee Institute opens in Alabama.
 July 14 – Billy the Kid is shot and killed by Pat Garrett outside Fort Sumner.
 July 20 – Indian Wars: Sioux chief Sitting Bull leads the last of his fugitive people in surrender to United States troops at Fort Buford in Montana.
 Summer – First ever summer camp held, on Chocorua Island in Grafton County, New Hampshire.
 August 27 – The fifth hurricane of the 1881 Atlantic hurricane season hits Florida and the Carolinas, killing about 700.
 September 5 – The Thumb Fire in the U.S. state of Michigan destroys over a million acres (4,000 km²) and kills 282 people.
 September 12 – Francis Howell High School (Howell Institute) in St. Charles, Missouri, and Stephen F. Austin High School in Austin, Texas open on the same day, putting them in a tie for the title of the oldest public high school west of the Mississippi River.
 September 19 – President James A. Garfield dies weeks after being shot. Vice President Chester A. Arthur becomes the 21st President of the United States.

October–December
 October 5–December 31 – International Cotton Exposition in Atlanta, Georgia
 October 18–21– Yorktown Centennial is observed in Virginia, Yorktown Victory Monument cornerstone laid. 
 October 22 – Boston Symphony Orchestra gives its inaugural concert.
 October 26 – The Gunfight at the O.K. Corral occurs in Tombstone, Cochise County, Arizona.
 October 29 – Judge magazine is first published.
 November 17 – The trial of Charles J. Guiteau begins in Washington, D.C.
 December 4 – The first edition of the Los Angeles Times is published.
 December 28 – Virgil Earp is ambushed in Tombstone and loses the use of his left arm.

Undated
 New York City's oldest independent school for girls, the Convent of the Sacred Heart New York (91st Street), is founded.
 Minto, North Dakota is founded.

Ongoing
 Gilded Age (1869–c. 1896)

Sport 
September 16 – The Chicago White Stockings win their Second straight (Third Overall) pennant with a 4–0 win over the Boston Red Caps.

Births
 January 8 – Henrik Shipstead, U.S. Senator from Minnesota from 1923 to 1947 (died 1960)
 January 15 – John Rodgers, U.S. Navy officer, naval aviation pioneer (died in aviation accident 1926)
 January 21 – Arch McCarthy, baseball player
 January 31 – Irving Langmuir, chemist, recipient of the Nobel Prize in Chemistry in 1932 (died 1957)
 February 17 – Bess Streeter Aldrich, fiction writer (died 1954)
 February 28 – Otto Dowling, U.S. Navy officer and 25th Governor of American Samoa (died 1946)
 March 4
 Maude Fealy, stage and film actress (died 1971)
 Thomas Sigismund Stribling, novelist (died 1965)
 Richard C. Tolman, mathematical physicist (died 1948)
 March 12 – Arthur Raymond Robinson, U.S. Senator from Indiana from 1925 to 1935 (died 1961)
 March 13 – Louis Chauvin, ragtime pianist (died 1908)
 March 29 – Raymond Hood, Art Deco architect (died 1934)
 April 16 – Alice Corbin Henderson, poet (died 1949)
 May 14 
 Maude Fulton, playwright and actress (died 1950)
 G. Murray Hulbert, politician (died 1950)
 June 9 – Marion Leonard, silent film actress (died 1956)
 July 2 – Royal Hurlburt Weller, politician (died 1929)
 July 4 – Ulysses S. Grant III, soldier and planner (died 1968)
 July 8 – Mantis James Van Sweringen, financier (died 1935)
 July 11 – Louise Marion Bosworth, social scientist (died 1982)
 July 22 
 Augusta Fox Bronner, psychologist, specialist in juvenile psychology (died 1966)
 Kenneth Whiting, U.S. Navy officer, submarine and naval aviation pioneer (died 1943)
 July 30 – Smedley Butler, U.S. Marine Corps general (died 1940)
 August 3 – Nathan Post, 7th and 10th Governor of American Samoa (died 1938)
 August 10 – Witter Bynner, poet and scholar (died 1968)
 August 12 – Cecil B. DeMille, film director (died 1959)
 August 20 – Edgar Albert Guest, poet (died 1959)
 September 8 – Harry Hillman, track athlete (died 1945)
 September 26 – Hiram Wesley Evans, Ku Klux Klan Imperial Wizard (died 1966)
 October 1 – William Boeing, engineer and airplane manufacturer (died 1956)
 October 10 – David Baird, Jr., U.S. Senator from New Jersey from 1929 to 1930 (died 1955)
 October 22 – Clinton Davisson, physicist, recipient of the Nobel Prize in Physics in 1937 (died 1958)
 October 30 – Elizabeth Madox Roberts, novelist and poet (died 1941)
 November 5 – George A. Malcolm, lawyer, Associate Justice of the Supreme Court of the Philippines and educator (died 1961)
 November 9 – Margaret Reed Lewis, cell biologist (died 1970)
 November 15 – Franklin Pierce Adams (F.P.A.), columnist, critic, writer and wit, member of the Algonquin Round Table (died 1960)
 November 20 – Arthur Marshall, ragtime composer and performer (died 1968)
 December 3 – Henry Fillmore, American composer and bandleader (died 1956)
 December 5 – Martin W. Clement, president of the Pennsylvania Railroad from 1935 to 1948 (died 1966)
 December 12 – Doris Keane, stage actress (died 1945)
 December 16 – Daniel F. Steck, U.S. Senator from Iowa from 1926 to 1931 (died 1950)
 George Steidler

Deaths
 January 3 – Anna McNeill Whistler, James Whistler's mother and subject of his painting (born 1804)
 February 14 – Fernando Wood, New York City mayor (born 1812)
 February 23 – Robert F. R. Lewis, naval officer (born 1826)
 April 24 – James T. Fields, publisher (born 1817)
 May 21 – Thomas A. Scott, industrialist (born 1823)
 June 18 – Henry Smith Lane, U.S. Senator from Indiana from 1836 to 1837 and from 1854 to 1858 (born 1811)
 July 14 – Billy The Kid, Old West gunfighter (killed) (born 1859)
 July 17 – Jim Bridger, explorer and trapper (born 1804)
 August 10 – Orville Hickman Browning, U.S. Senator from Illinois from 1866 to 1869 (born 1806)
 September 7 – Sidney Lanier, musician and dialect poet (born 1842)
 September 13 – Ambrose Burnside, Union Army general, railroad executive, inventor, industrialist and Rhode Island Senator (born 1824)
 September 15 – Susan May Williams, railroad heiress, wife of Jérôme Napoléon Bonaparte (born 1812)
 September 19 – James A. Garfield, 20th President of the U.S. from March to September 1881 (assassinated) (born 1831)
 September 22 – Solomon L. Spink, U.S. Congressman from Illinois (born 1831)
 October 3 – Orson Pratt, religious leader (born 1811)
 October 8 – Joseph Carter Abbott, U.S. Senator from North Carolina from 1868 to 1871 (born 1825)
 October 12 – Josiah Gilbert Holland, novelist and poet (born 1819)
 October 26 – shot in Gunfight at the O.K. Corral
 Billy Clanton, outlaw and brother of Ike Clanton (born 1862)
 Frank McLaury, Old West gunman and brother of Tom McLaury (born 1849)
 Tom McLaury, pioneer and Old West  gunman (born 1853)
 October 31 – George W. DeLong, naval officer and Arctic explorer (starvation) (born 1844)
 November 23 – Abijah Gilbert, U.S. Senator from Florida from 1869 to 1875 (born 1806)
 December 4 – Wood Hite, outlaw and cousin of Jesse and Frank James (shot) (born 1850)
 December 13 – John Quidor, painter (born 1801)

See also
Timeline of United States history (1860–1899)

References

External links
 

 
1880s in the United States
United States
United States
Years of the 19th century in the United States